Lacabarède is a commune in the Tarn department in southern France.

Geography
The Thoré forms the commune's northern border.

See also
Communes of the Tarn department

References

Communes of Tarn (department)